The Frauen-Bundesliga 2008–2009 is the 19th season of the Frauen-Bundesliga, Germany's premier women's football league. It began on 7 September 2008 and ended on 7 June 2009. Turbine Potsdam won the championship with Bayern Munich coming in second by single goal.

Final standings

Results

Top scorers

References

2008-09
Ger
1
Women1